The Secretary General of the Secretariat of the Legislative Council of Hong Kong, formerly called the Clerk to the Legislative Council of Hong Kong before 1995, is the head and chief executive of the Legislative Council of Hong Kong. The Secretary General is the principal adviser to the President of the Legislature on privileges and procedures.  The clerk's other responsibilities relate to the conduct of business of the Legislature and its committees. Many other officers and personnel provide assistance to the clerk.

List 
Past Secretaries General of the Legislative Council of Hong Kong:

 Mr. J. Stewart-Lockhart: 1884–1885 (acting)
 Arathoon Seth: 1885–1889, 1893
 J. M. Gutierrez: 1887 (acting)
 Mr. F. A. Hazeland: 1890 (acting)
 Mr. Alexander MacDonald Thomson: 1891–1892 (acting)
 Mr. John Gerald Thomas Buckle: 1894–1896 (acting), 1897, 1898–1903
 Captain Francis Joseph Badeley: 1896 (acting)
 Mr. Reginald Fleming Johnston: 1899–1903, 1904 (acting)
 Mr. Arthur George Murchison Fletcher: 1905–1908, 1912–1913, 1915–1917, 1920–1923, 1925
 Mr. Cecil Clementi: 1908, 1913 (acting)
 Mr. R. H. Crofton: 1911, 1913
 Mr. Michael James Breen: 1914
 Mr. Arthur Dyer Ball: 1918, 1922
 Mr. J. A. E. Bullock: 1919
 Mr. William James Carrie: 1920
 Mr. Samuel Burnside Boyd McElderry: 1920, 1923, 1924–26
 Mr. David William Tratman: 1927
 Mr. Norman Lockhart Smith: 1931
 Mr. Geoffery Cadzow Hamilton: 1949, 1950, 1952
 Mr. David Ronald Holmes : 1953
 Mr. Donald Collin Cumyn Luddington: 1956–1957
 Mr. Roderick John Frampton: 1970–1972
 Mr. Kenneth Harry Wheeler: 1973–1976
 Mrs. Lolly Tse Chiu Yuen-chu: 1975–1977
 Mr. Stephen Tam Shu-pui: 1978–1979
 Mrs. Lorna Leung Tsui Lai-man: 1978–1982
 Mrs. Jennie Chok Pang Yuen-yee: 1982–1986
 Mr. Li Wing: 1984–1985
 Mr. Law Kam-sang: 1986–1992
 Mr. Cletus Lau Kwok-hong: 1992–1994
 Mr. Ricky Fung Choi-cheung : 1994–2008
 Ms. Pauline Ng Man-wah : 2008–2012
 Mr. Kenneth Chen Wei-on : 2012–Incumbent

References

Legislative Council of Hong Kong
Lists of political office-holders in Hong Kong
Hong Kong, Legislative Council